William Duncan (February 8, 1871 – February 17, 1925) was an American politician and lawyer from Maryland. He served as a member of the Maryland House of Delegates, representing Baltimore, from 1900 to 1902.

Early life
William Duncan was born on February 8, 1871, in Baltimore, Maryland, to Louisa J. (née Linzey) and James Smith Duncan. He was educated at public schools in Baltimore. He also attended F. Knapp Institute and Loyola College (later Loyola University Maryland). He was admitted to the bar in 1894.

Career
Duncan started to practice law in 1894. His offices were at 713-14 Fidelity Building in Baltimore.

Duncan was a candidate for the clerk of Baltimore City Court on the Citizens' ticket. Duncan was a Democrat. Duncan served as a member of Maryland House of Delegates, representing the City of Baltimore, from 1900 to 1902.

Personal life
Duncan married Blanche N. They lived at 2629 North Calvert Street in Baltimore.

Duncan died from heart disease on February 17, 1925, at Hotel Dolphin in Miami, Florida. He was buried at Prospect Hill Cemetery in Towson, Maryland.

References

External links

1871 births
1925 deaths
Politicians from Baltimore
Democratic Party members of the Maryland House of Delegates
Maryland lawyers
20th-century American politicians